Pagliara (Sicilian: Pagghiara) is a comune (municipality) in the Metropolitan City of Messina in the Italian region Sicily, located about  east of Palermo and about  southwest of Messina.
 
Pagliara borders the following municipalities: Furci Siculo, Mandanici, Roccalumera, Santa Lucia del Mela.

References

External links
 Official website

Cities and towns in Sicily